Prien's wolfpack is the name given in some sources to a formation of German U-boats that operated during the  Battle of the Atlantic in World War II. It existed from 12 June to 17 June 1940.

Background
Prior to the Second World War the German Navy‘s U-boat Arm, under its leader, Karl Donitz, developed its pack attack, a response to the convoy system that had defeated its war on commerce during the First World War. However, following the outbreak of hostilities its first attempts to use the tactic had been unsuccessful.
Thereafter the UBW stuck to conventional patrols and solo attacks until diverted from the trade offensive to the invasion of Norway.

With the end of the Norwegian campaign in May 1940, the UBW returned to attacking Britain’s commerce. A further attempt to make the pack attack viable was made in June 1940 with the dispatch of Rosing’s group of five U-boats, against a high-value convoy, US 3, off Cape Finisterre.

Formation
At the beginning of June, a second wave of U-boats was dispatched to operate against Allied shipping. Rohwer, the U-boat historian, lists seven U-boats (U-25, U-28, U-30,  U-32, U-38, U-47, and U-51), and states they were set up between 12 and 15 June to operate against convoy HX 47, which had been detected by German Naval Intelligence. He refers to them in this as group "Prien".  However Blair (another U-boat historian), describes this second wave, of nine U-boats, as a series of individual patrols; mentioning a group of five set as a U-boat trap for ships evacuating troops from  Norway, and describing Rosing's pack in detail, he doesn't refer to a "group Prien" at all. Showell lists the seven U-boats mentioned by Rohwer, but calls them a "wolfpack". The online source U-boat.net follows Showell, but gives the dates of operation as 12 to 17 June. As only two boats made contact with HX 47, and they didn't form a pack to make their assault, the term "wolfpack" is a misnomer (and isn't used by most reliable sources at all).

Area of operation
This group was detailed to attack convoy HX 47 – en route from Halifax to Liverpool. 
Between 12 and 17 June the U-boats were on passage from the north of Scotland to the Southwest Approaches. On 14 June two boats (U-38 and U-47) made contact with HX 47, south of Ireland in the Atlantic. Attacking separately they sank three ships of the convoy, and another sailing independently. On 13 June U-25 found and sank the armed merchant cruiser Scotstoun in the Northwest Approaches, west of Skye. By 17 June all U-boats were west of the Bay of Biscay.

Ships hit

The hit didn't sink her, so just 10 hours later a second torpedo hit just aft of the funnel and caused the ship to sink by the stern. Seven crew members were killed.

The master, 39 crew members and one gunner were picked up by Germanic.

 Mount Myrto: At 19.11 hours on 14 June 1940 the Mount Myrto was shelled by 53 rounds from the surfaced U-38. After the shelling, the U-boat dived and struck the ship with a torpedo, but the ship did not sink due to her load of timber. Liebe decided to break off the attack on the damaged vessel because the convoy HX 47 came in sight.

 Erik Boye: On 15 June 1940, in the space of four minutes, U-38 fired torpedoes at and sank both the Italia and Erik Boye of convoy HX 47, about  W of the Scilly Isles.

 Italia: On 15 June 1940, Italia was struck by a torpedo near the engine room, killing nearly all the engine crew. The survivors were picked up by HMS Fowey.

Raiding Summary

U-Boats

References

Bibliography
Blair, Clay (1996) Hitler’s U-Boat War Vol I Cassell 
 Rohwer J, Hümmelchen G (1992) Chronology of the War at Sea 1939–1945 Naval Institute Press 
 JP Mallmann Showell (2002) U-Boat Warfare: The Evolution of the Wolfpack Ian Allan 

Wolfpacks of 1940
Wolfpack Prien